Wolfgang Freyberg (born 12 April 1956) is a German historian and slavicist. Freyberg was born in Göttingen, Lower Saxony and studied at the University of Göttingen. Since 1985 he is the director of the Cultural Center East Prussia in Ellingen, Bavaria.

References

1956 births
Living people
Writers from Göttingen
20th-century German historians
21st-century German historians